Tengerek (Tengereg) is a rural locality (a selo) in Dzhidinsky District, Republic of Buryatia, Russia. The population was 124 as of 2010. There is 1 street.

Geography 
Tengerek is located 32 km southwest of Petropavlovka (the district's administrative centre) by road. Zheltura is the nearest rural locality.

References 

Rural localities in Dzhidinsky District